EGSA Oran (is an Algerian concessions and construction company founded in 1987. Its head office is in Es Sénia, in the southern suburbs of Oran.

History
The EGSA Oran was created by decree N° 87-174 of 11 August 1987. It was transformed in its legal nature into a public establishment of an industrial and commercial nature by executive decree N° 91-150 of 18 May 1991. the establishment is endowed with the mission of public services and under the supervision of the Ministry of Public Works and Transport. In 2013 the compagnie it undertook the construction of the Ahmed Ben Bella Airport expansion works.

Airports
The EGSA Oran operates the following airports:
 Oran – Ahmed Ben Bella Airport
 Tlemcen – Zenata - Messali El Hadj Airport
 Tiaret – Abdelhafid Boussouf Bou Chekif Airport
 Mécheria – Cheikh Bouamama Airport
 Béchar – Boudghene Ben Ali Lotfi Airport
 Mascara – Ghriss Airport
 Adrar – Touat-Cheikh Sidi Mohamed Belkebir Airport
 Tindouf – Commandant Ferradj Airport
 El Bayadh – Kssal Airport
 Timimoun – Gourara Timimoun Airport
 Bordj Badji Mokhtar – Bordj Badji Mokhtar Airport

See also

 List of airports in Algeria

References

External links
  EGSA Oran official website

Aviation in Algeria
Government agencies of Algeria
1987 establishments in Algeria